Lepidoziaceae is a family of leafy liverworts. It is a group of small plants that are widely distributed.

Most of the species of this family are found in tropical regions.

The main characteristics of the family:

1. Oil bodies are small and unsegmented.
2. The leaves are never folded.
3a. In larger species, the leaves are three or four lobed (often dentate) and have an incubous insertion.
3b. In smaller species, the leaves may be divided to their base as filaments.

Description 
Species may range from a light to dark green, with some species of Bazzania bluish-green to brown.  When the plants branch, the branches do not grow from the underside of the stem.

The leaves are not folded, but are lobed or divided.  Species which grow as larger plants have the leaf tips divided in two to three lobes or teeth.  Smaller species typically have their leaves divided all the way to the base in two to five thread-like strands of cells. The underleaves vary as well, but typically resemble smaller versions of the lateral leaves.

The rhizoids are few and restricted to the base of the underleaves.  Species of Bazzania may have long ventral branches.

Subfamilies and genera 
Included subfamilies and genera:
(not assigned to a subfamily)
Meinungeria Frank Müll. 
Sprucella  1886,

Bazzanioideae Rodway
Acromastigum A.Evans
Bazzania Gray
Mastigopelma Mitt.
Drucelloideae R.M.Schust.
Drucella E.A.Hodgs.
Lembidioideae R.M.Schust.
Dendrolembidium Herzog
Hygrolembidium R.M.Schust.
Isolembidium R.M.Schust.
Kurzia G.Martens
Lembidium Mitt.
Megalembidium R.M.Schust.
Pseudocephalozia R.M.Schust.
Lepidozioideae Müll.Frib.
Ceramanus E.D.Cooper
Lepidozia (Dumort.) Dumort.
Neolepidozia Fulford & J.Taylor
Tricholepidozia (R.M.Schust.) E.D.Cooper
Micropterygioideae Grolle
Micropterygium Gottsche
Mytilopsis Spruce
Protocephalozioideae R.M.Schust.
Protcephalozia (Spruce) K.I.Goebel
Zoopsidoideae R.M.Schusts.
Amazoopsis J.J.Engel & G.I.Merr.
Hyalolepidozia S.W.Arnell ex Grolle
Monodactylopsis (R.M.Schust.) R.M.Schust.
Neogrollea E.A.Hodgs.
Odontoseries Fulford
Paracromastigum Fulford & J.Taylor
Psiloclada Mitt.
Pteropsiella Spruce
Telaranea Spruce ex Schiffn.
Zoopsidella R.M.Schust.
Zoopsis Hook.f. ex Gottsche

References

Other sources
 Meagher, David, and David Glenny. “A New Species ofBazzania (Lepidoziaceae) from New Zealand.” Journal of Bryology, vol. 29, no. 1, 2007, pp. 60–63., https://doi.org/10.1179/174328207x175184.
 Deo, Siddhartha Singh, and D. K. Singh. “Bazzania Bhutanica(Lepidoziaceae, Marchantiophyta) — a Critically Endangered Liverwort Recorded in Indian Bryoflora.” Lindbergia, vol. 2, 2014, pp. 42–46., https://doi.org/10.25227/linbg.01049.
 Grolle, Riclef (1983). "Nomina generica Hepaticarum; references, types and synonymies". Acta Botanica Fennica 121, 1-62.

 
Liverwort families